Pendergast (Piondárgas) is a Norman-Irish surname derived from Prendergast.

Pendergast may refer to:

Aloysius Pendergast, character in novels by Douglas Preston and Lincoln Child.
Clancy Pendergast (born 1967), American football coach
James Pendergast (1856–1911), American politician from Kansas City, Missouri; brother of Tom Pendergast 
Jane Pendergast, American biostatistician
Leeanna Pendergast (born 1962), Canadian politician from Ontario
Tom Pendergast (1872–1945), American political boss from Kansas City, Missouri; brother of James Pendergast
Tom Pendergast (footballer) (1870–1946), English footballer

Anglicised Irish-language surnames